IHC Leuven (French: IHC Louvain), is an ice hockey team in Leuven, Belgium. Leuven plays in the BeNe League (a.k.a. Belgian Elite League), where it competes as the Leuven Chiefs.  The team are the current Belgian national ice hockey champions, having won the league playoffs in 2013. It also competes annually for the Belgian Cup.

The Club also organizes affiliated recreational junior and senior hockey teams.

History
IHC Leuven was founded in 1993, and won their first Belgian Championship in 2005. In 1998 and 1999, they participated in the IIHF Continental Cup. In 1998, they were paired with Frisk Tigers, Esbjerg IK, and Lyon Hockey Club, they lost to Frisk 26–1, and their best results was a 15–1 loss to Lyon. They fared marginally better in 1999, in a group with Sokil Kyiv, Ducs d'Angers, and CHH Txuri Urdin. They were hammered by Angers 26–0, but only lost 4–3 to Txuri Urdin.

In 1999-2000, they won their first and only Belgian Cup. In 2005 and 2010, Leuven won their first and second Belgian Championship. In 2011, it joined the higher level North Sea Cup, a mixed Dutch-Belgian league, although it struggled against the bigger-budget Dutch teams and lost the Belgian championship to HYC Herentals.  For 2012-2013, it withdrew from the Dutch league and returned to the Belgian Elite League, winning the Belgian national championship against White Caps Turnhout.

Roster
Updated February 25, 2019.

Achievements
Belgian champion (3): 2005, 2010, 2013
Belgian Cup champion (1): 2006

Season Results
Note: GP = Games played, W = Wins, OTW = Overtime Wins, OTL = Overtime Losses, L = Losses, GF = Goals for, GA = Goals against, Pts = Points

References

External links
Official Site
Club profile on hockeyarenas.net

BeNe League (ice hockey) teams
 Ice hockey teams in Belgium
 Ice hockey clubs established in 1993
1993 establishments in Belgium
 Sport in Leuven